The 30th Actors and Actresses Union Awards ceremony was held on 14 March 2022 at the Circo Price in Madrid. The gala was hosted by Gloria Albalate.
 
In addition to the competitive awards,  received the '' award, Ángela Molina the '' career award and Fernando Marín the Special Award. Nominations were announced on 7 February 2022.

Winners and nominees 
The winners and nominees are listed as follows:

Film

Television

Theatre

Newcomers

International productions

References 

Actors and Actresses Union Awards
2022 in Madrid
2020 television awards
2021 television awards
2020 film awards
2020 theatre awards
2021 film awards
2021 theatre awards
March 2022 events in Spain